Tsung Pak Long is a village and the name of an area in Sheung Shui, North District, Hong Kong.

Administration
Tsung Pak Long is a recognized village under the New Territories Small House Policy. It is one of the villages represented within the Sheung Shui District Rural Committee. For electoral purposes, Tsung Pak Long is part of the Fung Tsui constituency, which was formerly represented by Chiang Man-ching until July 2021.

History

At the time of the 1911 census, the population of Tsung Pak Long was 184. The number of males was 105.

Hakka Wai
Hakka Wai is a Hakka walled village located in the Tsung Pak Long area. Construction of the village started in the 1900s-1910s and was completed by 1920.

References

External links

 Delineation of area of existing village Tsung Pak Long (Sheung Shui) for election of resident representative (2019 to 2022)
 Antiquities and Monuments Office. Hong Kong Traditional Chinese Architectural Information System. Hakka Wai
 Antiquities and Monuments Office. Hong Kong Traditional Chinese Architectural Information System. Bok Man
 Antiquities and Monuments Office. Hong Kong Traditional Chinese Architectural Information System Chan Ancestral Hall (Tsung Pak Long)

Populated places in Hong Kong
Sheung Shui
Walled villages of Hong Kong
Villages in North District, Hong Kong